Helicia is a genus of 110 species of trees and shrubs, constituting part of the plant family Proteaceae. They grow naturally in rainforests throughout tropical South and Southeast Asia, including India, Sri Lanka, Indochina, Peninsular Malaysia to New Guinea and as far south as New South Wales.

Conservation
At global, national and regional government scales, many Helicia species have been threatened with extinction, as officially recognised by the International Union for Conservation of Nature (IUCN) and by continental, national and local governments. Sixteen species have official IUCN global conservation statuses of either "critically endangered", "endangered", "vulnerable" or "near threatened" (in terms of global extinction).

Naming and classification
In 1790, notable pioneer botanist João de Loureiro described this genus as Helicia in his publication Flora Cochinchinensis. The type species for the genus was Helicia cochinchinensis, the type specimen of which was collected in Cochinchina, Vietnam. The genus name derives from the Greek word "" (élix), which refers to the petals, now called tepals, spirally revolving or simply rolling or coiling up on themselves, at anthesis (the flowering time when the anthers open).

In 1831, botanist Nathaniel Wallich named Helicia robusta for a dried specimen of a cultivated plant in India, based on the specimen's earlier 1814 name Roupala robusta by William Roxburgh. Roxburgh's Calcutta botanic gardens cultivated the plant.

From the 1850s to the 1860s notable German–Australian botanist Ferdinand von Mueller formally described several new Australian species. In the late 1800s and early 1900s Frederick M. Bailey concentrated further on additional Queensland species, writing descriptions of them in numerous scientific papers.

In 1939, Hermann O. Sleumer described many additional Malesian species, especially in New Guinea. In 1955, he published a revision of the genus. In 1956, his treatment of the genus in Flora Malesiana was published. From 1969 to the late 1990s botanist Don B. Foreman, who was based in Papua New Guinea and Australia, collected numerous additional species, which he formally described before he wrote the comprehensive reviews and flora treatments for the two regions; notably in the authoritative Handbooks of the Flora of Papua New Guinea (1978–1995, to date 3 volumes), he wrote the chapters for Proteaceae and other families; and in the authoritative Flora of Australia (1981–, 60 volume series) he wrote the treatment of Helicia.

From the 1990s botanist Richard C. K. Chung, based in Malaysia, published new species formal descriptions and a revision of the 13 species occurring in Borneo. In total, approximately 100 species have been formally scientifically described.

Lawrie Johnson and Barbara G. Briggs grouped Helicia with Xylomelum in the subtribe Heliciinae, tribe Helicieae, and subfamily Grevilleoideae in their 1975 monograph "On the Proteaceae: the evolution and classification of a southern family". However, genetics studies showed these two to be relatively unrelated, instead finding the closest genetic correlations between Hollandaea and Helicia, and therefore classifying them both in the subtribe Heliciinae within the tribe Roupaleae.

Diversity and description

They grow naturally across the Malesia region with the major centre of species diversity of about fifty species in New Guinea. They grow naturally in the south west Pacific ocean region, and in north and eastern Australia. They grow naturally across southern and eastern Asia, including Indonesia, Malaysia and another centre of species diversity of about twenty species in southern China, extending to parts of the Indian subcontinent, the Philippines, Taiwan, and southern Japan. The plant family Proteaceae's 1,700 species (approximate) have their greatest diversity in the southern hemisphere and smaller centres of diversity including some Helicia, in the near northern hemisphere. The species diversity of the plant family Proteaceae decreases further northwards. H. cochinchinensis has the natural distribution reaching furthest north to Japan where it grows into trees in the mountains of warmer parts and where no other species nor other Proteaceae genera occur. The same Japanese name  for this species, also means the whole genus and the entire Proteaceae plant family. In the New Guinea and southern China centres of species diversity, many species grow in forests, up to as tall as the sub-canopy, especially diverse in rainforests. In Australia, they are generally components of rainforests, and prefer richer soils, especially in the farthest south region of Helicia'''s global distribution, the Illawarra, New South Wales, south of Sydney, where only one species H. glabriflora occurs, preferring richer basalt soils.

Cultivation
In India and east Asia Helicias have been cultivated in botanic gardens, from the 1800s. In Australia they have rarely been cultivated, and were thought to have little horticultural value. The rusty-coloured new growth is attractive on some species. In some of the better known Australian species, the flowers and fruit are generally not prominent, and plants can be slow growing. They are generally propagated by seed, the viability of which drops rapidly with time.

Species
(this list may have a small number of species missing, presently it has 99, out of the approximate total stated by sources of 110)

 Helicia acutifolia  – New Guinea –  Vulnerable
 Helicia affinis  – New Guinea
 Helicia albiflora  – New Guinea –  Near threatened
 Helicia amplifolia  – New Guinea –  Near threatened
 Helicia archboldiana  – New Guinea
 Helicia attenuata  – Borneo
 Helicia australasica  – New Guinea, Australia –  Vulnerable
 Helicia blakei  – Australia
 Helicia bullata  – New Guinea
 Helicia calocoma  – New Guinea –  Vulnerable
 Helicia cameronii  – New Guinea
 Helicia carrii (Syn: H. brassii, H. divaricata ) – New Guinea
 Helicia celatus  – New Guinea
 Helicia ceylanica  – Sri Lanka endemic
 Helicia clivicola  – China region
 Helicia cochinchinensis  – China, Indochina, Taiwan, Japan
 Helicia coeruleopurpurea  – New Guinea
 Helicia commutata  – New Guinea
 Helicia dongxingensis  – China region
 Helicia excelsa  – Borneo
 Helicia falcata  – China region
 Helicia ferruginea  – Australia
 Helicia finisterrae  – New Guinea
 Helicia forbesiana  – New Guinea
 Helicia formosana  – China region
 Helicia fragilis  – New Guinea
 Helicia fuscotomentosa  – Borneo endemic
 Helicia glabriflora  – eastern Australia
 Helicia graciliflora  – Philippines endemic
 Helicia grandifolia  – Vietnam endemic –  Vulnerable
 Helicia grandis  – China region
 Helicia grayi  – Australia
 Helicia hainanensis  – China region
 Helicia hypoglauca  – New Guinea, New Britain
 Helicia insculpta  – New Guinea
 Helicia insularis  – New Guinea –  Endangered
 Helicia islandica  – New Guinea
 Helicia kwangtungensis  – China region
 Helicia laiagamensis  – New Guinea
 Helicia lamingtoniana  – Australia
 Helicia latifolia  – New Guinea –  Near threatened
 Helicia lauterbachiana (Syn: H. grandifolia ) – New Guinea
 Helicia ledermannii  – New Guinea
 Helicia lewisensis  – NE Queensland, Australia
 Helicia longespicata  – New Guinea
 Helicia longipetiolata  – China region
 Helicia loranthoides  – Philippines endemic
 Helicia macrostachya  – New Guinea
 Helicia maxwelliana  – Borneo: Sabah endemic, rare
 Helicia microneura  (Syn: H. arguta ) – New Guinea
 Helicia microphylla  – New Guinea
 Helicia moluccana  – Moluccas
 Helicia neglecta  – New Guinea Bismarck Archipelago endemic: New Britain, New Ireland –  Vulnerable
 Helicia nilagirica  – Southeast Asia, Yunnan, India, Nepal
 Helicia nortoniana  – Australia
 Helicia obovata  – Java, Borneo
 Helicia obovatifolia  – China region
 var. mixta  – China region
 var. obovatifolia – China region
 Helicia obtusata (Syn: H. clemensiae ) – New Guinea
 Helicia odorata  – New Guinea
 Helicia olivacea  – New Guinea
 Helicia oreadum  – New Guinea
 Helicia pallescens  – New Guinea
 Helicia paucinervia  – Philippines endemic
 Helicia peekelii  – New Guinea Bismarck Archipelago: New Ireland endemic –  Vulnerable
 Helicia peltata  – New Guinea –  Critically endangered
 Helicia petiolaris  – Borneo
 Helicia platyphylla  – New Guinea
 Helicia polyosmoides  – New Guinea Bismarck Archipelago: Manus Island endemic –  Critically endangered
 Helicia pterygota  – Borneo: Sabah endemic, rare
 Helicia pyrrhobotrya  – China region
 Helicia recurva  – Queensland Australia
 Helicia rengetiensis  – China region
 Helicia retevenia  – New Guinea
 Helicia reticulata  – China region
 Helicia retusa  – New Guinea –  Vulnerable
 Helicia robusta  var. robusta – Malesia: Borneo, Philippines, India
 Helicia rostrata  – New Guinea –  Vulnerable
 Helicia rufescens  – Borneo, rare
 Helicia saruwagedica  – New Guinea
 Helicia saurauioides  – New Guinea
 Helicia schlechteri  – New Guinea
 Helicia sellae-montis  – New Guinea
 Helicia serrata  var. serrata – Borneo
 Helicia sessilifolia  – Borneo: Sabah & Sarawak endemic, uncommon
 Helicia shweliensis  – China region –  Endangered
 Helicia silvicola  – China region
 Helicia sleumeri  – New Guinea
 Helicia stelechantha  – New Guinea
 Helicia subcordata  – New Guinea –  Critically endangered
 Helicia symplocoides  – Borneo: Sabah endemic, rare
 Helicia tibetensis  – China region
 Helicia torricellensis  – New Guinea
 Helicia tsaii  – China region
 Helicia uganensis  – New Guinea Bismarck Archipelago endemic: New Britain, New Ireland
 Helicia varoyenii  – New Guinea
 Helicia versteeghii  – New Guinea
 Helicia vestita 
 var. longipes  – China region
 var. vestita – China region incl. Thailand
 Helicia wollastonii  – New Guinea
 Helicia yangchunensis''  – China region

References

Cited works 

 
 
 
 
 

 
Proteaceae genera
Taxonomy articles created by Polbot
Proteales of Australia